Sir John Wolfe Barry  (7 December 1836 – 22 January 1918), the youngest son of famous architect Sir Charles Barry, was an English civil engineer of the late 19th and early 20th century. His most famous project is Tower Bridge over the River Thames in London which was constructed between 1886 and 1894. After receiving a knighthood in 1897, he added "Wolfe" to his inherited name in 1898 to become Sir John Wolfe Barry.

Early career
Wolfe Barry was educated at Glenalmond and King's College, London, where he was a pupil of civil engineer Sir John Hawkshaw, as was his business partner Henry Marc Brunel, son of the great Isambard Kingdom Brunel. Barry and Hawkshaw worked on railway bridge crossings across the Thames, among other projects. Brunel pursued his own business from 1871, but in 1878 went into partnership with Barry. Barry began his own practice in 1867, and carried out more work for the railways.

Tower Bridge
However, it was Tower Bridge that made Wolfe Barry's name. In 1878, architect Horace Jones first proposed a bascule bridge. An Act of Parliament allowing the Corporation of the City of London to build it was passed in 1885. Jones was appointed architect, and developed an initial scheme for which he was knighted in 1886. Wolfe Barry, already well-established with experience of bridges across the Thames, was introduced as the engineer for the project and with Henry Marc Brunel redesigned the mechanisms resulting in a modified plan. Within a month of construction starting Sir Horace Jones died, leaving Wolfe Barry and Brunel to oversee and complete the works. The bridge was completed in 1894.

Other projects
His other projects included:
 Cannon Street Railway Bridge (also known as the Alexandra Bridge) (1866)
 Blackfriars Railway Bridge (also known as St Paul's Bridge), London (1886) 

In 1891, he entered into partnership with his nephew Lt. Col. Arthur John Barry and the partnership's projects included:

 Barry Docks (not a namesake) near Cardiff, south Wales
 District line of the London Underground (with Sir John Hawkshaw)
 Pumping stations on the Regent's Canal, north London
 Kew Bridge, west London (1903)
 Expansion of Greenland Dock, Surrey Docks (now Surrey Quays), south-east London (1904)
 Immingham Dock (1912)
 Joint Dock, Kingston upon Hull (1914), with Benjamin Baker.)
 No.3 Fish Dock, Grimsby (1934)

Industry standardisation

Wolfe Barry was a recognised industry leader (he was elected President of the Institution of Civil Engineers in 1896, knighted in 1897, and served on several Royal Commissions).

He also played a prominent role in the development of industry standardisation, urging the ICE's Council to form a committee to focus on standards for iron and steel sections. Two members each from the ICE, the Institution of Mechanical Engineers, the Institution of Naval Architects and the Iron and Steel Institute first met on 26 April 1901. With the Institution of Electrical Engineers who joining the following year, these bodies were the founder institutions of what is today the British Standards Institution or BSI.

Late career
He was elected a Fellow of the Royal Society (FRS) in 1895 and made a Knight Commander of the Order of the Bath (KCB) in 1897. He was elected President of the Institution of Civil Engineers (Pres.Inst.C.E.) in 1898, in which year he assumed his middle name of Wolfe as an additional surname. He was also a member of the Smeatonian Society of Civil Engineers.

He was chairman of Cable and Wireless from 1900 to 1917. In 1902 he joined the consulting firm of Robert White & Partners, which was renamed Wolfe Barry, Robert White & Partners (later, in 1946, renamed Sir Bruce White, Wolfe Barry and Partners).

Personal life

He had married Rosalind Grace, the daughter of Rev Evan Edward Rowsell of Hambledon, Surrey. They had four sons and three daughters. In 1922 a memorial window designed by Sir John Ninian Comper was dedicated to his memory in the nave of Westminster Abbey.

He added the name Wolfe to his forename after receiving an inheritance from his godfather, the architect John Lewis Wolfe (1798–1881).

Wolfe Barry published the results of an investigation into his family's genealogy in 1906.

Wolfe Barry died in January 1918, and was buried in Brookwood Cemetery near Woking in Surrey.

References

External links

Robert C. McWilliam, Barry, Sir John Wolfe (1836–1918), Oxford Dictionary of National Biography, 2004 (Subscription required)
 This article on his father contains a paragraph describing John Wolfe Barry's career.
 Sir John Wolfe Barry, biography at the Tower Bridge Restoration website

        
        
        
        
        
        

1836 births
1918 deaths
People educated at Glenalmond College
Alumni of King's College London
Artists from London
Architects from London
English civil engineers
Fellows of the Royal Society
Presidents of the Institution of Civil Engineers
Presidents of the Smeatonian Society of Civil Engineers
Burials at Brookwood Cemetery
Knights Commander of the Order of the Bath
John